Eriogonum thomasii is a species of wild buckwheat known by the common name Thomas' buckwheat. It is native to the desert southwest of the United States and northern Mexico where it is common in many areas, sometimes becoming a weed.

Description
It is a thin annual herb growing up to 30 centimeters tall, with a basal rosette of rounded leaves around the stem. The inflorescence is a wide open array of stem branches bearing clusters of tiny yellowish to pinkish flowers.

External links
Jepson Manual Treatment
Photo gallery

thomasii
Flora of Northwestern Mexico
Flora of Arizona
Flora of New Mexico
Flora of Utah
Flora of the California desert regions
Flora of the Great Basin
Flora of the Sonoran Deserts
Flora without expected TNC conservation status